KFMI (96.3 FM) is a commercial radio station in Eureka, California.  KFMI airs a Top 40 music format. It also airs Rick Dees Weekly Top 40, Party Playhouse, Open House Party, and Out of Order.

External links

FMI
Mass media in Humboldt County, California
Hot adult contemporary radio stations in the United States